Oakridge Country Club is a golf course located in Farmington, Utah. Oakridge Country Club is a private, member-owned 18-hole golf course designed by William F. Bell and William Neff. The Country Club opened in 1957 and has approximately 400 members. During the Davis County windstorm of December 2011, hurricane-force winds ripped through the country club and destroyed an estimated 400 old growth trees, vastly changing the landscape and scenery of the course. In the spring of 2016, Oakridge completed a project to clean ponds, expand irrigation water storage and improve the design of the water features.

Notable tournaments hosted
Web.com Tour Utah Championship
Utah Open
Utah Amateur
Korn Ferry Golf

References

External links

Golf clubs and courses in Utah
1957 establishments in Utah
Buildings and structures in Farmington, Utah